This is a list of Whig Party MPs. It includes all Members of Parliament elected to the British House of Commons representing the Whig Party.

List of MPs

A

References

See also 

Lists of United Kingdom MPs by party
Whigs (British political party)